"Procession" is a 1971 song by the Moody Blues and is the opening track of their album Every Good Boy Deserves Favour. It is the only song to have been co-written by all five members of the band.

"Procession" is one of the first commercial songs to make use of electronic drums. The instrument in question was a custom drum synth developed by Moody Blues drummer Graeme Edge and Sussex University professor Brian Groves.

For the most part, "Procession" is an instrumental song, with the exception of its three spoken words: "desolation", "creation", and "communication". These words, as well as other words ending in "-ation", also appear on the album track "One More Time to Live."

A section of "Procession" was sampled by hip-hop musicians J Dilla and Madlib on the 2003 Jaylib album Champion Sound; the sample appears on the opening track "L.A. to Detroit."

Personnel
 Justin Hayward ― electric and acoustic guitars, sitar, vocals
 John Lodge ― bass, vocals
 Mike Pinder ― Moog synthesizer, piano, harpsichord, Hammond organ, Mellotron, vocals
 Ray Thomas ― flute, vocals
 Graeme Edge ― electronic and acoustic drums, percussion, vocals

References

The Moody Blues songs
1971 songs
Songs written by Ray Thomas
Songs written by John Lodge (musician)
Songs written by Mike Pinder
Songs written by Justin Hayward
Songs written by Graeme Edge